Brandon Scott Jones (born June 6, 1984) is an American actor, comedian, and writer. He is best known for his role as Captain Isaac Higgintoot in the CBS series Ghosts and as Donny in the Warner Bros./Netflix film Isn't It Romantic.

Life and career
Jones was born in Bel Air, Maryland, and studied at the New York Conservatory for Dramatic Arts in New York City. He is a regular performer at the Upright Citizens Brigade Theatre in New York and Los Angeles. In 2015, Jones was named one of Comedy Central’s Comics to Watch. In 2021, he received his breakthrough role as Captain Isaac Higgintoot on the supernatural sitcom Ghosts on CBS, for which he was nominated for the Critics' Choice Television Award for Best Supporting Actor in a Comedy Series. The following year, he co-wrote and starred in the film Senior Year.

Selected filmography

Film

Television

Awards and nominations

References

External links
 

1984 births
21st-century American male actors
American male film actors
American male screenwriters
American male television actors
American gay actors
LGBT people from Maryland
Living people
Male actors from Maryland
People from Bel Air, Maryland